Bonneuil is the name or part of the name of seven communes of France:

Bonneuil, Charente in the Charente département
Bonneuil, Indre in the Indre département
Bonneuil-en-France in the Val-d'Oise département
Bonneuil-en-Valois in the Oise département
Bonneuil-les-Eaux in the Oise département
Bonneuil-Matours in the Vienne département
Bonneuil-sur-Marne in the Val-de-Marne département